"Ezekiel Saw the Wheel" is an African American spiritual arranged by William L. Dawson.

It has been recorded by such artists as Woody Guthrie, Paul Robeson, John Lee Hooker, the Dixie Hummingbirds, the Tillers, the Fisk Jubilee Singers, The Charioteers and Gold City. The song recounts the Old Testament prophet Ezekiel's divine vision, described at the start of the eponymous book.

Bing Crosby included the song in a medley on his album 101 Gang Songs (1961).

Lyrics
Ezekiel saw the wheels;
Way in the middle of the air.
Ezekiel saw the wheels;
Way in the middle of the air.

Chorus
And the big wheel run by Faith, good Lord;
And the little wheel run by the Grace of God;
In the wheel in the wheel good Lord;
Way in the middle of the air.

Who's that yonder dressed in white?
Way in the middle of the air.
It must be the children of the Israelites:
Way in the middle of the air.

Chorus
And the big wheel run by Faith, good Lord;
And the little wheel run by the Grace of God;
In the wheel in the wheel in the wheel good Lord;
Way in the middle of the air.

Who's that yonder dressed in red?
Way in the middle of the air.
It must be the children that Moses led:
Way in the middle of the air.

Ezekiel saw the wheel;
Way up in the middle of the air.
Now Ezekiel saw the wheel in a wheel;
Way in the middle of the air.

Who's that yonder dressed in black?
Way in the middle of the air.
It must be the children running' back:
Way in the middle of the air.

Chorus
And the big wheel run by Faith, good Lord;
And the little wheel run by the Grace of God;
In the wheel in the wheel in the wheel good Lord;
Way in the middle of the air,
Way in the middle of the air.

See also 
 "Dem Bones" is another metrical paraphrase of "Ezekiel".
 For a description of the biblical passage, see Merkabah.
 The Martian Chronicles chapter, "Way in the Middle of the Air", takes its title from this song.
 The opening credits of Project U.F.O. quote the song.
 Christian child's prayer § Spirituals

External links 
 Words and midi music

Book of Ezekiel
Pace Jubilee Singers songs
Year of song unknown
Songwriter unknown
Songs based on the Bible
African-American spiritual songs